Logan County High School is a four-year public high school in Russellville, Kentucky with an enrollment of 1,034 students in grades 9 through 12. The current principal is Caycee Spears.

Sports
The school is a member of Kentucky High School Athletic Association. The school's boys' basketball team won the state championship in 1984.

Notable alumni
Mark Thompson - professional baseball player for the Colorado Rockies and the St. Louis Cardinals. 
Joseph Jefferson - Former professional cornerback for the Indianapolis Colts.

References

External links

Schools in Logan County, Kentucky
Public high schools in Kentucky
Russellville, Kentucky